Bard is an unincorporated community in Imperial County, California, United States, located along County Route S24. It lies at an elevation of 138 feet (42 m). Bard is home to the Imperial Date Gardens.

Bard was created in 1910 after the eastern part of the Fort Yuma Indian Reservation was declared surplus under the Dawes Act. The first post office at Bard opened in 1910 and closed in 1933. The post office was re-established in 1937. Bard's ZIP Code is 92222. The name honors Thomas R. Bard, a promoter of the irrigation district.

Climate
This area has a large amount of sunshine year round due to its stable descending air and high pressure.  According to the Köppen Climate Classification system, Bard has a desert climate, abbreviated "BWh" on climate maps.

References

Unincorporated communities in Imperial County, California
Unincorporated communities in California
Populated places established in 1910
1910 establishments in California